Nicholas John De Noia Jr. (May 14, 1941 – April 7, 1987) was an American director, screenwriter, and choreographer known for his work as choreographer of the Chippendales dance troupe and for his Unicorn Tales shorts for young audiences, for which he won two Emmy Awards.

De Noia was married to Jennifer O'Neill from 1975 to 1976, although he was a closeted homosexual.

Murder
On April 7, 1987 at 3:40 PM, De Noia was shot in the face with a large caliber pistol while sitting in his 15th floor office desk at 264 West 40th Street, Manhattan located near the garment district. He was shot by Gilbert Rivera Lopez, recruited by Ray Colon, an accomplice of Somen ("Steve") Banerjee who originally hired Colon to murder De Noia. At the time, De Noia no longer worked for Banerjee but had a licensing arrangement through a company called Chippendales Universal to use the name Chippendales for tour engagements. Banerjee was dissatisfied with the business arrangement which was memorialized on a cocktail napkin. Banerjee tried unsuccessfully to break the contract in New York courts. The murder of Nick De Noia was orchestrated by Banerjee along with the burning of a competitor's Red Onion nightclub. Banerjee pleaded guilty to murder, arson and RICO charges in July 1994.
Under a plea bargain, Banerjee pleaded guilty and sentenced to 26 years in prison. He died by suicide in prison while awaiting final sentencing. Chippendales was inherited by Banerjee's wife.

Legacy

Actor Murray Bartlett portrays Nick De Noia in the Hulu miniseries, Welcome to Chippendales.

References

1941 births
1987 deaths
American television directors
American choreographers
Deaths by firearm in Manhattan
American people of Italian descent
People murdered in New York City
American gay writers
LGBT choreographers
LGBT people from New York (state)
Male murder victims
American LGBT screenwriters
Gay screenwriters